Sexual harassment in education in the United States is an unwelcome behavior of a sexual nature that interferes with an American student's ability to learn, study, work or participate in school activities. It is common in middle and high schools in the United States.  Sexual or gender harassment  is a form of discrimination under Title IX of the Education Amendments of 1972. Sexual harassment involves a range of behavior from mild annoyances to unwanted touching and, in extreme cases, rape or other sexual assault.

The definition of sexual harassment includes harassment by both peers and individuals in a position of power relative to the person being harassed. In schools, though sexual harassment initiated by students is most common, it can also be perpetrated by teachers or other school employees, and the victim can be a student, a teacher, or other school employee. Some have argued that even consensual sexual interactions between students and teachers constitute harassment because the inherent power differential creates a dynamic in which "mutual consent" is impossible.

Statistics
In their 2000 survey on 2064 students in 8th through 11th grade, the American Association of University Women (AAUW) reported:
 81% or eight out of 10 students experience sexual harassment in school
 83% of girls have been sexually harassed
 78% of boys have been sexually harassed
 38% of the students were harassed by teachers or school employees
 36% of school employees or teachers were harassed by students
 42% of school employees or teachers had been harassed by each other

In their recent study (AAUW 2006) on sexual harassment at colleges and universities, the AAUW claimed that while both men and women were targets of sexual harassment, "women are disproportionately negatively affected."

62% of female college students and 61%  of male college students report having been sexually harassed at their university.
66% of college students know someone personally who was harassed.
10% or fewer of student sexual harassment victims attempt to report their experiences to a university employee.
35% or more of college students who experience sexual harassment do not tell anyone about their experiences.
80% of students who experienced sexual harassment report being harassed by another student or former student.
39% of students who experienced sexual harassment say the incident or incidents occurred in the dorm.
51% of male college students admit to sexually harassing someone in college, with 22% admitting to harassing someone often or occasionally.
31% of female college students admit to harassing someone in college.
Over 70% of LGBT college students have experienced sexual harassment.

In the "Report Card on Gender Equity," the NCWGE that 30 percent of undergraduate students, and 40 percent of graduate students, have been sexually harassed. (NCWGE, 1997)

The Associated Press reported 2,500 cases of teacher sexual misconduct between 2002 and 2007. From 2001 to 2005, 2,570 teacher credentials were revoked for sexual misconduct. There were about 3 million teachers at the time.

Demographics

Gender 
According to surveys conducted by the AAUW in 1993 and 2001:
 While in both surveys, female students reported experiencing sexual harassment more than the male students, the percentage of male students reporting sexual harassment increased from 49% in 1993 to 56% in 2001.
 In 2001, female students who had been sexually harassed in school reported male-to-female harassment that was one-on-one while male students who experienced sexual harassment reported either one-to-one harassment by a female, or harassment by a group of females.

Race 
In the same surveys (AAUW 1993, 2001) it was found that:
 21% of white male students reported having had someone tug at or pull down their clothing in an inappropriate way, while only 10% of African American male students reported this.
 While 51% of Hispanic and 51% of white female students experienced being touched in an inappropriate, sexual manner, 67% of African American females experienced this.
 18% of Hispanic, 15% of white, and 28% of African American female students reported having been forced to kiss someone.
 30% of Hispanic, 32% of white, and 50% of African American female students have had someone tug or pull down their clothing in an inappropriate way.

Types 
There are three primary types of sexual harassment found in schools: verbal, visual/non-verbal, and physical. The most common type is verbal, followed by physical, and visual/non-verbal.  In the survey conducted by the AAUW in 2000, it was found that 6 out of 10, or 58% of the students reported experiencing some form of physical harassment at some point during their time in school, and 76% reported experiencing nonphysical (verbal or visual/nonverbal) at some point during their time in school.

Verbal 
Verbal sexual harassment includes unwanted sexual humor, sexual rumors, inappropriate sexual name calling, and homophobic slurs, judging or rating others' body parts, pressure for sexual relationships, and sexual harassment via phone calls.

Visual/non-verbal 
Visual/non-verbal sexual harassment includes unwanted written sexual communication (notes, text messages, letters, email), unwanted sexual facial expressions or gestures, indecent exposure, and the showing of sexual pictures.
Advancements in technology have expanded visual/non-verbal sexual harassment to also include taking unsolicited photographs and videos of students.

Physical 
Physical sexual harassment includes sexually brushing against someone, having one's clothing pulled or tugged in a sexual manner, unwanted sexual touching, and any forced kissing or touching.

Peer-to-peer
Most sexually harassing behavior is student-on-student. In "The Report Card on Gender Equity", by the National Coalition for Women and Girls in Education (NCWGE), it was reported that, of students who have been sexually harassed, 90% were harassed by other students. (NCWGE, 1997) And in their 2006 report on sexual harassment in higher education, the AAUW reported that 80% of students sexually harassed were targeted by other students. (AAUW, 2006)

One of the most common reasons reported for sexually harassing behavior is because the harasser thinks it is funny to do so. In their 2006 study, the AAUW found that this was the most common rationale for harassment by boys—59 percent used it. Less than one-fifth (17%) of those boys who admitted to harassing others say they did so because they wanted a date with the person. (AAUW, 2006) Other researchers assert that the "I thought it was funny" rationale is a fallacy, and the true reasons align more with that of a need to assert power and induce fear in others—more in line with bullying. These hazing behaviors develop in school, continue in high school and college, eventually moving into the workplace. (Boland, 2002)   
   
In late 2006/early 2007 a study revealed that more than 20% of all boys had been harassed by a female student. In 15% of all cases the girl admitted to sexually harassing the boy and asserted the reasons of "I thought it was funny" and "I'm not doing any harm, it's what he wanted". High schools are addressing this behavior.

Peer-to-peer sexual harassment is three times more likely than perpetration by teachers or other school faculty. Sexual harassment between peers may also be a result of students trying to conform to expected gender norms created by society. It can also be used as a tool for gender policing. For example, this could be seen if a male is exhibiting behavior not seen to peers as being masculine, so others may label him with homophobic slurs in order to reinforce gender conformity through a form of nonphysical sexual harassment. Students may exhibit, accept, or tolerate this conforming behavior as to not cause rifts in peer groups.

Developmental causes may also result in sexual harassment among students. Those who are unprepared to interact with those of the opposite sex, are unable to appropriately read social cues, or try to exhibit sexual interest in another while not understanding appropriate boundaries, may end up engaging in sexually harassing behavior.

By teachers

Prevalence
In their 2002 survey, the AAUW reported that, of students who had been harassed, 38% were harassed by teachers or other school employees. One survey that was conducted with psychology students reports that 10% had sexual interactions with their educators; in turn, 13% of educators reported sexual interaction with their students. In a national survey conducted for the American Association of University Women Educational Foundation in 2000, it was found that roughly 290,000 students experienced some sort of physical sexual abuse by a public school employee between 1991 and 2000. A major 2004 study commissioned by the U.S. Department of Education found that nearly 10 percent of U.S. public school students reported having been targeted with sexual attention by school employees. Indeed, one critic has claimed that sexual harassment and abuse by teachers is 100 times more frequent than abuse by priests.

A secondary analysis of a series of surveys conducted for the AAUW and administered to a representative sample of 2,064 8th through 11th-grade American students in 2000 showed that 9.6% of the students reported educator sex abuse. The students were asked if and how often they had experienced 14 types of behaviors which constitute sexual harassment. They then indicated who harassed them (students, teachers, school employees). Nonphysical sexual abuse (e.g., making sexual jokes) was more prevalent than physical abuse (8.7 and 6.7%). Girls were more likely to report educator sexual harassment than boys (10.3 and 8.8%). 12.3% of black, 12.2% of Latino, 8.4% of white and 1.8% of Asian students indicated that they had experienced sexual harassment by teachers.

Regional studies found a different prevalence of sexual harassment by teachers. For example, in a survey of 148 high school graduates in North Carolina in 1989 the graduates were given a definition of sexual harassment and asked if they had experienced sexual harassment during their high school years. 43% reported inappropriate comments, looks, or gestures by a teacher, 17.5% reported sexual touching, and 13.5% indicated that they have had sexual intercourse with a teacher. In another study college students were asked to recall if they or other students had experienced sexual harassment by high school teachers. 6.5% of the respondents reported having personally experienced sexually inappropriate attention from high school teachers. Furthermore, more than 33% said that they knew of a sexual relationship between a high school student and a teacher.

Psychology and behaviors of perpetrators
Most complaints about a teacher's behavior tend to center around what is felt to be inappropriate speech in a class or discussion, such as using sexist or sexual references to make a point. However, in some cases, bonds and relationships can form between teacher and student beyond class discussions. Relationships between students and teachers can be often quite intimate and intense as they share common passions and interests. Students are dependent on their teachers' approval for academic success, opportunities, and later career success. They will talk about personal issues, such as problems at home, or with boyfriends/girlfriends. Such closeness and intimacy can blur the professional boundaries and lead teachers to feel comfortable taking advantage of a student. Martin writes,

...teachers hold positions of trust. They are expected to design teaching programmes and carry out their teaching duties to help their students develop as mature thinkers. This may involve close working relationships in tutorials or laboratories, individual meetings to discuss projects or essays, and more casual occasions for intellectual give and take. For impressionable young students, the boundaries between intellectual development and personal life may become blurred. In this situation, some academics easily move from intellectual to personal to sexual relationships.

A teacher who harasses a student may be doing so because he or she is experiencing the stress from various personal problems or life traumas, such as marital trouble or divorce, a professional crisis, financial difficulties, medical problems, or the death of a spouse or child. Even though the behavior is unacceptable, it can be a symptom of the effects of such stresses, and may stop if the situation changes, or the pressures are removed.

Sexual relationships between students and teachers
There has been debate over whether or not sexual interactions and relationships between students and teachers constitute sexual abuse.

While sexual relationships with pupils is illegal in the U.S., this is not the case in higher education. Literature professor Jane Gallop argues that students learn more effectively in a sexually charged atmosphere. In her book, she describes the separate occasions she slept with two male professors on her dissertation committee, and when she first began sleeping with her own students as an assistant professor. (Gallop, 1997). In her September 2001 essay in Harper's Magazine, The Higher Yearning, academic Christina Nehring celebrated the educative nature of such sexual relationships: "Teacher-student chemistry is what fires much of the best work that goes in universities, even today".

However, in recent years, there has been controversy over consensual sexual interactions between students and teachers, especially within the last decade. Like many, Gallop asserts that the relationships between a teacher and a student is very much like that of a parent and a child. (Gallop, 1997) However, it is this parallel that many say is the reason teacher-pupil sexual contact and relations are immoral because they are too closely akin to incest, and similar long-term damages can result.

Many experts argue that even consensual sexual interactions between students and teachers constitute sexual harassment. The most commonly expressed concern is over whether "mutual consent" can exist in a relationship where there is such a disparity in power between the people involved. Because of this, more and more schools are adopting policies that forbid amorous relationships between students and professors "in the instructional context" even when they are consenting (Smithson, 1990).  Dzeich et al. writes:

In an interview with the Chronicle of Higher Education, a dean at the University of Texas at Austin stated he'd like to crack down on consensual relationships between professors and students. "Wait until she graduates," he says he tells male professors. "We have a kind of sacred trust to the students," he explains. "They're coming here to get us to evaluate what their abilities are and what their future could be. These relationships poison the whole academic well."

Dzeich argues that much damage occurs because of the betrayal by someone that the student trusted and respected. Moreover, seduction attempts which are masked by pretenses to academic and personal attention are particularly damaging because the student feels complicit in their own abuse. (Dzeich 1990)

Another consequence is that, when sex is an accepted behavior between teachers and students, it can be more difficult to raise concerns about sexual harassment. For example, unwanted sexual advances by a professor may be intimidating or even frightening; however, if sexual relations between staff and students is common at the school, it will be difficult for a student to identify this behavior as harassment. (Martin, 1993)

Abuse of trust and conflicts of interest 
Sexual relations between teachers and students raises concerns about the abuse of trust and conflicts of interest—and these points are not usually covered in sexual harassment policies.

The question of abuse of trust comes into play when sexual relations between teacher and student are present. This occurs when the trust associated with a professional relationship is destroyed because of non-professional actions or requests for non-professional actions. Martin writes, "Teachers are in a position of authority and trust to foster the intellectual development of their students. When they engage in sexual relations with a student, they violate that trust implicit in a professional teacher-student relationship." (Martin, 1993)

Conflicts of interest can arise when the professional responsibilities of a teacher are affected, or appear to be affected, by a special personal relationship with a student. These can include showing favoritism towards a student sexually involved with the teacher, or hostility towards a student due to a past relationship. If a teacher is sexually involved with a student, colleagues may feel pressured to give preferential treatment to the student, such as better marks, extensions on essays, extra help, or academic opportunities. When there are multiple relationships between several staff and students, the possibilities for conflict of interest are enormous. Even if there is no favoritism or hostility, it can be perceived by others to be exhibited.

Special education 
Like all other students, students with disabilities experience sexual harassment in school as victims and perpetrators. Some disabilities could cause a lack of control over impulses, a lack of awareness of the effects of their words and actions, and a lack of social skills needed to avoid sexually harassing behavior. In some circumstances, a student with disabilities could exhibit a behavior that would constitute sexual harassment without intentionally trying to be malicious or inappropriate. In these cases, where a disability could lead to sexually harassing behaviors, positive behavior intervention plans are often put into place by a team often including parents, school administrators, general education teachers, special education teachers, school psychologists, and counselors. These types of plans could also be made during Individualized Education Program meetings regarding the student.

Independent schools 

While the recent changes in Title IX have made sexual harassment something that can't be ignored, this does not apply to independent schools.

In 2018 independent schools created a Prevention and Response Task Force Report to provide guidelines for private schools, yet this does not have much accountability built in to the system.

Recently a spattering of schools have dealt with this issue of sexual harassment that can be "creepy but not criminal."

One school is Sonoma Academy where a group of alumnae formed the Athena Project to have the school investigate (and subsequently) fire a teacher who had groomed female students for decades, as found by a report the school funded.

This school is oddly represented by the same law firm Folger Levin that represents other independent schools that had investigations that found educator sexual misconduct such as University High School and Branson in California. (Close to Sonoma.) In the Branson and University reports there was an educator who moved between schools despite it being common knowledge that he had dated a student. Years later the student sued and brought the issue to more light in 2021.

Effects

In higher education 
In their 2006 report, "Drawing the Line: Sexual Harassment on Campus" the AAUW found physical and emotional effects from sexual harassment on female students: 
68% of female students felt very or somewhat upset by sexual harassment they experienced;
6% were not at all upset.
57% of female students who have been sexually harassed reported feeling self-conscious or embarrassed.
55% of female students who have been sexually harassed reported feeling angry.
32% of female students who have been sexually harassed reported feeling afraid or scared.
The AAUW also found that sexual harassment affects academics and achievement:

Students experience a wide range of effects from sexual harassment that impact their academic development including: have trouble sleeping, loss of appetite, decreased participation in class, avoid a study group, think about changing schools, change schools, avoid the library, change major, not gone to a professor/ teaching assistant's office hours. Students may experience multiple effects or just one. The wide range of experiences lowers the percentage of students who experience any particular effect.

16% of female students who have been sexually harassed found it hard to study or pay attention in class.
9% of female students dropped a course or skipped a class in response to sexual harassment.
27% of female students stay away from particular buildings or places on campus as a result of sexual harassment. 
In the same 2006 report, the AAUW also found effects from sexual harassment on male and LGBT students:
 35% of male college students reported feeling very or somewhat upset about being sexually harassed.
 61% of male students reported feeling not very upset or not at all upset about experiencing sexual harassment.
 20% of male students reported feeling worried about sexual harassment, to some extent.
 60% of LGBT college students who were sexually harassed tried to avoid their harasser.
 24% of LGBT college students who were sexually harassed had difficulties paying attention in class and studying.
 17% of LGBT college students who had experienced sexual harassment have considered transferring to a different school and 9% made the transfer.

In 2018, a national advisory report of the National Academies of Sciences, Engineering and Medicine found that sexual harassment is rampant in academic science and concluded that sexual harassment should be treated as seriously as research misconduct. To report such behaviour is difficult for those concerned, given that scientists-in-training often dependent on a single high-profile mentor for research funding, job recommendations and fieldwork.

In K-12 education 
Studies have shown that if the sexual harassment was done by a male, both male and female victims experienced behavioral problems, in contrast to if the female was the perpetrator, where the behavioral problems occurred less. Being absent from school frequently, having difficulties concentrating on school work, and performing poorly on academic work often result. In a 2011 nationwide survey conducted by the AAUW of 7th-12th grade students, 32% of students who had experienced sexual harassment did not want to return to school after it occurred. This included 37% of female students and 25% of male students. 31% of the surveyed students felt physically sick after being sexually harassed, with 37% of females and 21% of males reporting this effect. 30% of students had difficulties studying and focusing on school as a result of sexual harassment including 34% of females and 24% of males, and 19% of students reported having a difficult time sleeping due to sexual harassment, including 22% of females and 14% of males. Other effects include getting into trouble at school, changing the route in which one gets to and from school, and stopping doing activities and sports.

By teachers
A reanalysis of the AAUW data found that victims of sexual harassment by teachers reported experiencing adverse health effects because of the abuse. 28% said that they had trouble sleeping and lost their appetite, 51% reported feeling embarrassed, and 37% indicated that they felt less sure of themselves or less confident as a result of the sexual harassment. Furthermore, 36% of the students said that they were afraid or scared and 29% reported feeling confused about their identity. In addition to negatively affecting health outcomes, teacher sexual abuse influenced the victims' academic performance. The affected students avoided the teacher (43%), they did not want to go to school (36%), avoided talking in class (34%), had trouble paying attention (31%), cut classes (29%), or found it hard to study (29%).

The gender double standard
Some sources have discussed a double standard regarding the conduct of female versus male teachers. When it comes to sexual harassment or sexual abuse cases involving a male teacher as the perpetrator to a female student, severe punishments are often the result. According to David Ring, a lawyer working with sexual abuse cases, it is not uncommon for the male teachers to be convicted, face jail time, or owe partial civil damages to the student victim depending on the severity of the case. When a female teacher is the perpetrator of sexual harassment to a male student, there are arguments that the female teachers are given lighter sentences and the male victims are given lower amounts of compensation due to the reasoning that teenage males would be willing to have sexual encounters with older, female teachers as a response to changes in their hormones.

It has been argued that the effects of pupil-teacher sexual harassment vary depending on the gender of the student and the harasser.  In some states in the U.S., sexual relations between a woman and an underage male did not even constitute statutory rape until the 1970s.  Many assert that most boys would be happy to have a teacher show sexual interest in them. While the effects vary from student to student, evidence shows that both male and female victims exhibit similar psychological effects from pupil-teacher sexual harassment. In the long term, experts have suggested that victims experience issues with depression, addiction, and age-appropriate relationships.

Complaints
In 1999, roughly 14% of complaints to the U.S. Department of Education Office of Civil Rights (OCR) involved sex discrimination.  "Sexual harassment is as serious (and some would say more serious) a problem as it is in the workplace....(it) is not a new phenomena.  But it is only recently that the Supreme Court has said that schools can be held liable for money damages for sexual harassment."

The U.S. judicial system does not analyze the types of harassment in the same way they do harassment in the workplace.  Instead, the US Supreme Court ruled in Gebser v. Lago Vista Independent School District (1998) that it "will not hold a school district liable in damages under Title IX for a teacher's sexual harassment of a student absent actual notice and deliberate indifference."

However, many harassment targets fear to make reports because of the possible repercussions.  
Of the women who have approached her to share their own experiences of being sexually harassed by their professors, feminist author Naomi Wolf wrote:
I am ashamed of what I tell them: that they should indeed worry about making an accusation because what they fear is likely to come true. Not one of the women I have heard from had an outcome that was not worse for her than silence. One, I recall, was drummed out of the school by peer pressure. Many faced bureaucratic stonewalling. Some women said they lost their academic status as golden girls overnight; grants dried up, letters of recommendation were no longer forthcoming. No one was met with a coherent process that was not weighted against them. Usually, the key decision-makers in the college or university—especially if it was a private university—joined forces to, in effect, collude with the faculty member accused; to protect not him necessarily but the reputation of the university, and to keep information from surfacing in a way that could protect other women. The goal seemed to be not to provide a balanced forum, but damage control.

In addition, there are many inconsistencies regarding some technology-based sexual harassment and abuse laws. Individual states must try to prosecute the crimes via existing, usually outdated, laws such as those for "peeping Toms" or breach of privacy. In Kansas, for example, a private school teacher is being charged under outdated breach of privacy law for recording over 100 female students in a state of undress over a period of 5 years. The Kansas law includes the word "telegraph", a service whose main provider ceased offering the service in 2006. The US Supreme Court has yet to set a precedent in this area of the law. These students are further being victimized, beyond the existing trauma of abuse, by injustice.

Court cases

Franklin v. Gwinnett County (GA) Public Schools (1992) 
In 1992, the Supreme Court decided that, out of the violation of their civil rights, students who were victims of sexual harassment have the right to seek monetary damages from their school district. This was a major step taken by the Supreme Court where before this decision, compensation was not up for grabs from the damage in sexual harassment cases.

Davis v. Monroe County Board of Education 
In 1994, when a judge ruled that the school district was not liable for the sexual harassment that occurred when a fifth grade boy allegedly made attempts to inappropriately touch a female student, the case made its way to the Supreme Court. In 1999, the Supreme Court decided that once sexual harassment among peers has been reported to a school district, they must be held responsible.

Bruneau v. South Kortright (NY) Central School District (1996) 
When a sixth grade girl was sexually harassed by some of her male peers, under Title IX, she was able to file charges against her school district, teacher, and assistant superintendent, and receive compensation for the damages. Ultimately, because the school district was made aware of the situation and failed to address it, they were found liable for this incident.

Handling in schools 
Schools, under Title IX, are required to investigate a situation where there is a report of sexual harassment as well as formally addressing the issue to students, staff, and parents as a preventative measure.

In a study conducted by the AAUW in 2011, of 7th to 12th grade students, only 12% of the surveyed students felt that their school did enough to address sexual harassment.

In colleges and universities 
When college students were surveyed, it was found that 35% do not tell anyone about a sexual harassment occurrence, 49% tell a friend, and only 7% go to a school faculty member to report the incident. Female students especially were noted to hesitate to report these incidents in fear that the incidents are not important enough or a large enough deal. 54% of the surveyed college students listed this as a reason for not reporting sexual harassment.

Policies and procedures 
79% of surveyed college students know of sexual harassment policies in their colleges. The U.S. Department of Education's Office for Civil Rights has mandated that schools create policies for sexual harassment as well as procedures for how to handle reports of these instances. The Office for Civil Rights' guidelines for effective sexual harassment policies include:
 Issuing a policy against sex discrimination
 Incorporating grievance procedures
 Creating specific investigation plans and timelines
 Explaining where one can file a report
 Designating one person (at least) to be the Title IX coordinator for complaints and provide the school faculty and students with that person's contact information
 Creating a disciplinary plan for the perpetrators
 Ensuring that all of the sexual harassment policies and procedures are easily accessible to students, teachers, faculty, and parents
Along with sexual harassment policies in colleges and universities, brochures or informational handouts are often distributed, and there are often designated locations or personnel on campus where victims can report sexual harassment. Under Title IX, schools that receive federal funding must designate a coordinator to whom those who need to report sexual harassment can go to, as well as who can receive suggestions and feedback from students on how to improve upon how the school is dealing with sexual harassment. This is required of all schools who receive federal funding, not only in higher education.

Prevention 
Aside from dealing with sexual harassment as it occurs, using the designated procedures, prevention is often used to eliminate sexual harassment before it begins, particularly in schools. The U.S. Department of Education's Office for Civil Rights has stated that training is part of the prevention of sexual harassment in schools and in their 2001 publishing of Sexual Harassment Guidance: Harassment of Students by School Employees, Other Students or Third Parties, they have indicated that not only should academic institutions provide faculty and teacher training, but also provide students with classroom resources in order to make them aware of what constitutes sexual harassment and what to do if it occurs. It is often recommended that consistent anti-sexual harassment workshops begin in the younger grades so that students remain informed and the policies are strongly enforced.

In media and literature

 Blue Angel: a novel by Francine Prose; a satire of college English and writing departments, and "politically correct" sexual harassment policies.
Camille Claudel: true-life inspired film about the brilliant French sculptor who has a long-term affair with her teacher, Auguste Rodin.
Wild Things: 1998 movie starring Matt Dillon, Denise Richards and Neve Campbell in where a teacher is accused of inappropriate conduct with several of his female students, which is the driving plot of the film.
Disgrace: a novel by J. M. Coetzee about a South African literature professor whose career is ruined after he has an affair with a student.
The History Man: novel by Malcolm Bradbury and later was a BBC television film.
Myth, Propaganda and Disaster in Nazi Germany and Contemporary America: a play by Stephen Sewell in which the main character, a university professor, is accused of engaging in a sexual relationship with a student, they both come to harm in the end, the professor because of his radical political ideology and the student because of her Muslim faith.
Notes on a Scandal: a novel by Zoë Heller which depicts the sexual relationship between a married art teacher and one of her students.
Oleanna: an American play by David Mamet, later a film starring William H. Macy.  A college professor is accused of sexual harassment by a student. 
Pretty Persuasion: film starring Evan Rachel Wood and James Woods in which students turn the tables on a lecherous and bigoted teacher. A scathingly satirical film of sexual harassment and discrimination in schools, and attitudes towards females in media and society.
The Prime of Miss Jean Brodie: a novel by Muriel Spark, and later a play and a film starring Maggie Smith.  A teacher at an Edinburgh school engineers a sexual relationship between a male colleague, and former lover, and one of her students.
What Lies Beneath: film starring Michelle Pfeiffer and Harrison Ford about a woman who is haunted by the ghost of her husband's former student, whom he murdered to keep from exposing an affair between them.
Nothing Lasts Forever (Sheldon novel): a novel written by Sidney Sheldon, has a female character who uses sexual harassment on her teachers and principal to woo them and get good marks in exams.
The Wood of Suicides: a 2014 novel by Laura Elizabeth Woollett, in which a high school senior pursues her English teacher after the death of her father.

See also

References

Further reading
American Association of University Women. Hostile Hallways: Bullying, Teasing, and Sexual Harassment in School. AAUW, 2002.
 American Association of University Women. Drawing the Line: Sexual Harassment on Campus. AAUW,2006.
Boland, Mary L. Sexual Harassment: Your Guide to Legal Action. Naperville, Illinois: Sphinx Publishing, 2002.
Dromm, Keith. Sexual Harassment: An Introduction to the Conceptual and Ethical Issues. Broadview Press, 2012.
Dziech, Billie Wright, Weiner, Linda. The Lecherous Professor: Sexual Harassment on Campus. Chicago Illinois: University of Illinois Press, 1990.
Finkelhor, David. Child Sexual Abuse: New Theory & Research. Free Press, 1984
Gallop, Jane. Feminist Accused of Sexual Harassment. Duke University Press, 1997.
Martin, Brian. Campus sex: a cause for concern?. EEO Sexual Harassment Sub-committee Pamphlet, University of Wollongong, Australia, 1993.
National Coalition for Women and Girls in Education, (NCWGE) Title IX at 30:  Report card on gender equity.  Title IX report card. Washington, D.C.: National Women's Law Center, 1997.
Patai, Daphne. Heterophobia: Sexual Harassment and the Future of Feminism. Rowman & Litlefield, 1998.
Smithson, Isaiah. "Investigating gender, power, and pedagogy," in Smithson, Isaiah, and Gabriel, Susan eds. Gender in the Classroom: Power and Pedagogy.  University of Illinois Press, 1990.
Wishnietsky, Dan H. "Reported and Unreported Teacher-Student Sexual Harassment." Journal of Education Research, 1991, Vol. 3
Zalk, Sue Rosenburg. "Men in the academy: a psychological profile of harassment." in Paludi, Michele A. ed. Ivory Power: Sexual Harassment On Campus. Albany, NY, State University of New York Press, 1987.

External links and further reading
Crossing the Line (2011)
SESAME-Stop Educator Sexual Abuse, Misconduct, and Exploitation
U.S. Dept. Of Education Sexual Harassment Resources
Educator Sexual Misconduct: A Synthesis of Existing Literature - U.S. Department of Education
SHOC - Sexual Harassment on Japanese Campuses
Seduced in the Classroom - Court TV slide show
Harassment and Sexual Harassment in schools
Committee for Children: Bullying and sexual harassment in schools
Popular lesson plan for teaching young people about sexual harassment
The Silent Treatment - Naomi Wolf article on the propensity for education to ignore sexual harassment and abuse complaints
Database of stories of sexual harassment in education - maintained by Sexual Harassment Support

 

es:Acoso sexual en la educación
ja:性的いじめ